Saraa may refer to:
Sarantuya (born 1970), Mongolian pop singer
Susquehanna Area Regional Airport Authority (SARAA)
Saraa Barhoum, main figure of the Palestinian children's TV program Tomorrow's Pioneers

See also
Sara (disambiguation)
Sarah (disambiguation)